The 2014 IRB Junior World Rugby Trophy was the seventh annual international rugby union competition for Under 20 national teams, second-tier world championship.

The event was held in Hong Kong and was organized by rugby's governing body, the International Rugby Board.

Teams

Pool Stage

Pool A 

{| class="wikitable" style="text-align: center;"
|-
!width="200"|Team
!width="25"|Pld
!width="25"|W
!width="25"|D
!width="25"|L
!width="25"|TF
!width="35"|PF
!width="35"|PA
!width="35"|PD
!width="25"|BP
!width="25"|Pts
|-
|align=left| 
| 3 || 2 || 0 || 1 || 10 || 77 || 72 || +5 || 2 || 10
|-
|align=left| 
| 3 || 2 || 0 || 1 || 7 || 72 || 40 || +32 || 2 || 10
|-
|align=left| 
| 3 || 2 || 0 || 1 || 6 || 67 || 31 || +36 || 1 || 9
|-
|align=left| 
| 3 || 0 || 0 || 3 || 2 || 24 || 97 || -73 || 0 || 0
|}

Fixtures

Pool B 

{| class="wikitable" style="text-align: center;"
|-
!width="200"|Team
!width="25"|Pld
!width="25"|W
!width="25"|D
!width="25"|L
!width="25"|TF
!width="35"|PF
!width="35"|PA
!width="35"|PD
!width="25"|BP
!width="25"|Pts
|-
|align=left| 
| 3 || 2 || 0 || 1 || 15 || 99 || 73 || +26 || 4 || 12
|-
|align=left| 
| 3 || 2 || 1 || 0 || 6 || 67 || 59 || +8 || 0 || 10
|-
|align=left| 
| 3 || 1 || 0 || 2 || 8 || 78 || 75 || +3 || 3 || 7
|-
|align=left| 
| 3 || 0 || 1 || 2 || 6 || 55 || 92 || -37 || 0 || 2
|-
|}

Fixtures

Knockout stage

7th place game

5th place game

Third place game

Final

References 

2014
2014 rugby union tournaments for national teams
rugby union
International rugby union competitions hosted by Hong Kong
rugby union